The following article is a list of characters from the British television series Thomas & Friends and the reboot series Thomas & Friends: All Engines Go.

Standard gauge engines

The main cast

The Eight Famous Engines

Classic series
Thomas (voiced by Ben Small from 2009-2015, John Hasler from 2015-2021 in the UK, Martin Sherman from 2009-2015 and by Joseph May from 2015-2021 in the US; voiced by Meesha Contreas in the US and by Aaron Barashi in the UK in Thomas & Friends: All Engines Go) is a blue anthropomorphic tank engine who works on the North Western Railway, and is number 1. He initially worked as the station pilot at the Big Station. After helping rescue James from a nasty accident, Thomas was rewarded with two faithful coaches, Annie and Clarabel, and permanently assigned to the Ffarquhar Branch Line. He is based on the London, Brighton and South Coast Railway E2 class.
Edward (voiced by Keith Wickham in the UK and William Hope in the US) is an old blue mixed-traffic tender engine who runs his own branch line with BoCo, Bill and Ben, which travels from Wellsworth to Brendam, and is number 2. He is one of the oldest engines on Sodor and is occasionally made fun of for his age. He is based on a GNSR Class F 'Gordon Highlander'.
Henry (voiced by Keith Wickham in the UK and Kerry Shale in the US) is a green mixed-traffic tender engine who works on the Main Line, and is number 3. He was originally a prototype engine that needed special Welsh coal to operate properly. Following his accident when pulling the Flying Kipper, Henry was rebuilt, giving him a new shape and better performance, and eliminating the need for the expensive special coal. He is based on an LMS Stanier Class 5 4-6-0. 
Gordon (voiced by Keith Wickham from 2009-2020 in the UK and by Kerry Shale from 2009-2020 in the US; voiced by Neil Crone in the US and by Will-Harrison Wallace in the UK in Thomas & Friends: All Engines Go) is a big blue tender engine who works on the Main Line, and is number 4. He is one of the fastest and strongest engines on Sodor and his main task is to pull the railway's express train. At times, this leads him to feel superior. He's mainly used for passenger duties but has occasionally pulled goods trains, much to his disliking, as he believes that these are below him. He is based on an LNER Gresley Classes A1 and A3.
James (voiced by Keith Wickham from 2009-2017, Rob Rackstraw from 2017-2021 in the UK, and from 2015-2020 in the US, Kerry Shale from 2009-2015 in the US; voiced by Luke Marty in the US and by Tom Dussek in the UK in Thomas & Friends: All Engines Go) is a red anthropomorphic mixed-traffic tender engine who works on the North Western Railway, usually on the Main Line, and is number 5. He is proud of his splendid red paintwork, but tends to be vain, boastful, and overconfident, and does not like getting dirty. Despite being a mixed-traffic engine, he does not like pulling trucks and feels superior to the others except the big engines. He is based on the Lancashire & Yorkshire Railway Class 28.
Percy (voiced by Keith Wickham from 2009-2015, Nigel Pilkington from 2015-2021 in the UK, Martin Sherman from 2009-2015 and by Christopher Ragland in 2015-2021 in the US; voiced by Charlie Zeltzer in the US and by Henri Charles in the UK in Thomas & Friends: All Engines Go) is a little green saddle tank engine who was brought to Sodor to help run the railway during Henry, Gordon, and James' strike, and is number 6. He is Thomas' best friend and one of the junior engines on the North Western Railway, often getting himself into trouble when he tries to play tricks on the other engines. His favourite job is to deliver the mail and he works on Thomas' Branch Line as a goods engine. 
Toby (voiced by Ben Small in 2009-2015, Rob Rackstraw from 2015-2021 in the UK and William Hope in the US) is an anthropomorphic brown square tram engine who used to work on his own railway near Thomas' Branch Line, and is number 7. After his old tramway closed, he was bought by the Fat Controller and he now works on Thomas' Branch Line with his faithful coach Henrietta. He is based on a GER Class C53.
Duck (voiced by Steven Kynman) is a Great Western tank engine who runs his own branch line with Oliver, and is number 8. He thinks that there are two ways of doing things, the Great Western way and the wrong way. Duck's real name is Montague, but he is nicknamed Duck because he "waddles". He is the only one of the Eight Famous Engines to not be a part of the Steam Team. He is based on a GWR 5700 Class.

Other Steam Team members

Classic series
Emily (voiced by Teresa Gallagher in the UK from 2009-2021 and by Jules de Jongh in the US from 2009-2021; voiced by Kayla Lorette in the US and by Marie Ekins in the UK in Thomas & Friends: All Engines Go) is an emerald tender engine who is bighearted, and acts as an older sister figure to the other engines despite being fussy and impulsive at times. She is number 12, but she never had a number on her until Series 24. Following her rescue of Gordon from a collapsing bridge, and James, Percy, and Rebecca from a derailment, Emily became Sodor's safety engine. After she rescued Oliver from an accident, the Fat Controller rewarded her with a brand new pair of coaches. She speaks with a Scottish accent in the UK and with an American accent in the US. She is based on a GNR Stirling 4-2-2.

CGI series
Nia (voiced by Yvonne Grundy from 2018-2021 and by Talia Evans in the US and by Sade Smith in the UK in Thomas & Friends: All Engines Go) is an orange tank engine from Kenya who befriended and accompanied Thomas on his journey around the world, and is number 18. When Thomas returned to Sodor, Nia revealed she did not have a home to go to since her shed was destroyed, so Thomas invited her to live on Sodor, taking Edward's place at Tidmouth Sheds. She is based on the KUR ED1 class.
Rebecca (voiced by Racheal Miller) is a big yellow tender engine who was originally from the North Western Railway, and is number 22. Rebecca has taken Henry's place at Tidmouth Sheds. She is a very cheerful and uplifting engine who always sees the best in everyone. She often helps Gordon pull the express during busy periods, but she also pulls goods trains on the Main Line. She is based on the SR West Country and Battle of Britain classes.

Other engines

Classic series
Donald (voiced by Joe Mills from 2015-2016 and Rob Rackstraw from 2016-2017) and Douglas (voiced by Joe Mills) are twin black mixed-traffic tender engines from Scotland, and their numbers are 9 and 10. They tend to work together on the railway, although they can be argumentative. They are based on the Caledonian Railway 812 and 652 Classes. 
Oliver (voiced by Joe Mills) is a green Great Western tank engine who works with Duck on his branch line, and is number 11. He and his brake van Toad made a daring escape to Sodor from being scrapped and were almost caught at the last moment, but they were saved by Douglas. Oliver is not to be confused with Oliver the Excavator. He is based on a GWR 1400 Class.
Bill (voiced by Jonathan Broadbent from 2013-2016, Tim Whitnall in 2018 and Rasmus Hardiker in 2018-2021) and Ben (voiced by Jonathan Broadbent from 2013-2016 and and Matt Wilkinson from 2018-2021) are yellow saddle tank engine twins owned by the Sodor China Clay Company. The prototypes are the distinctive Bagnall tank locomotives used at Par in Cornwall. They're mischievous and love to play pranks on the other engines. They both work at the docks and the company's clay pits. They are based on "Alfred" and "Judy".
Diesel (voiced by Kerry Shale in the UK, the US version beginning with 2015-2021, Michael Brandon from 2010-2012 and by Martin Sherman from 2013-2014 in the US version and voiced by Shomoy James Mitchell in Season 1, Will Bhanjea in Season 2 and by Henry Smith in the UK in Thomas & Friends: All Engines Go) is a sinister diesel engine who has an oily, devious, scheming, and malicious nature and holds a grudge against the steam engines. Despite holding a grudge against the steam engines, he readily gets used to them. Despite this, he still desires to be a useful engine. He is based on a British Rail Class 08.
Daisy (voiced by Teresa Gallagher from 2015-2016 and The Great Race and Tracy-Ann Oberman from 2016-2021) is a green diesel railcar who came to work on the Ffarquhar Branch Line after Thomas crashed into the Stationmaster's house. She now works on the Harwick Branch Line carrying out passenger duties, while Ryan runs the goods duties. She is based on a British Rail Class 122.
BoCo is a long green diesel engine that works at the goods station on Edward's Branch Line. He, along with Edward, is a mentor to Bill and Ben. He is based on a British Rail Class 28.
The City of Truro is one of the three real-world tender engines to have appeared in the TV series, the others being Stephenson's Rocket and Flying Scotsman. In the episode "Gordon & the Famous Visitor", he is only referred to as "The Famous Engine", although a banner outside the sheds features his name and number. He normally resides at the National Railway Museum on the Mainland. 
Mavis (voiced by Teresa Gallagher in the UK, the US version beginning with 2013-2017 and Jules de Jongh from 2009-2012 in the US version) is a privately owned diesel engine who works for the Ffarquhar Quarry Company, based at Farquhar Quarry. She also works at the Sodor Slate Quarry. She is based on a British Rail Class 04.
The Flying Scotsman (voiced by Rufus Jones) is one of the only three real-world tender engines to have appeared in the TV series, the others being Stephenson's Rocket and the City of Truro. He works on the Mainland and is Gordon's younger brother, despite teasing Gordon by calling him "little brother" in reference to having achieved greater feats than Gordon. He has two tenders, one for coal and water, and one strictly for water.
Stepney is a "bluebell" tank engine painted Improved Engine Green who works on the Bluebell Railway, and is number 55. Rusty saved him from being scrapped. His enthusiastic attitude, together with his friendliness, make him a welcome visitor on the Fat Controller's railway. His real-life basis can be seen at the Bluebell Railway in West Sussex. He is based on the LB&SCR A1 class.
D261 is a big green diesel engine who was brought to Sodor to help the other engines. He sucked in an inspector's bowler hat through his air pipe, which lead to his engine failing. He has not officially returned to Sodor after that incident, though he has appeared in many tie-in magazine stories. He is based on a British Rail Class 40.
Derek is a large green diesel engine that has "teething" troubles. He was not officially named until merchandise was released. He is friends with Bill and Ben and works for the Sodor China Clay Company. He is based on a British Rail Class 17.
'Arry (voiced by Kerry Shale) and Bert (voiced by Kerry Shale from 2010-2011 and William Hope from 2012-2017) are twin diesel engines who work at the smelters and scrapyards of the Sodor Ironworks. They're often as mischievous as Diesel and frequently try to scrap any steam engine that wanders into the Sodor Ironworks. Like Diesel, 'Arry and Bert are based on a British Rail Class 08.
Lady (voiced by the series creator Britt Allcroft) is a small, magenta, Victorian-styled tank engine that is the main traveler of the Magic Railroad. She is the key to producing gold dust. She is based on a GWR 101 Class.
Diesel 10 (voiced by Matt Wilkinson) is an evil diesel engine with an excavator claw arm, which he has named "Pinchy" who does not like steam engines. He is based on a British Rail Class 42.
Splatter (voiced by Neil Crone) and Dodge (voiced by Kevin Frank) are two diesel engines, which were Diesel 10's bumbling minions in Thomas and the Magic Railroad. They're collectively called "Splodge" by Diesel 10. They are yet another British Rail Class 08.
Salty (voiced by Keith Wickham) is a red dockyard diesel shunter who works at Brendam Docks. He speaks like a stereotypical pirate and enjoys telling stories revolving around the sea and fantasy. He is often blunt about his indifference to the rivalry between steam engines and diesel engines. He speaks with a West Country English accent and uses a lot of nautical slang. He is based on a British Rail Class 07.
Harvey (voiced by Keith Wickham) is a maroon tank engine with a crane mounted on top of his boiler, which makes him look rather unusual, and is number 27. He is very cheerful and helps clean up after other engines' crashes. He is based on Shelton Iron & Steel Works No. 4101, or "Dusby". *
Fergus is a small railway traction engine who works at the Sodor Cement Works. He is strict with the rules and his catchphrase is "Do it right!" He is based on an Aveling & Porter 2-2-0WT "Blue Circle".
Arthur is a big maroon tank engine who works on the Norramby Branch Line. He was very proud of his spotless record, which was broken when he crashed into Duck's goods train. He is based on an LMS Ivatt Class 2 2-6-2T.
Murdoch is an orange tender engine that pulls goods trains. He is based on a BR Standard Class 9F.
Spencer (voiced by Matt Wilkinson in the UK and Glenn Wrage in the US) is the Duke and Duchess of Boxford's silver streamlined tender engine who is also Gordon's cousin and arch-rival. He is based on an LNER Class A4.

New series
Molly is a bright yellow tender engine who is kind and pulls goods and passenger trains. She is based on a GER Class D56.
Neville is a ubiquitous, square-shaped tender engine who looks like a diesel engine. He is based on an SR Q1 class.
Dennis is a lazy diesel who dislikes hard work, but enjoys making other engines do it for him. He is based on a British Rail 11001.
Rosie (voiced by Teresa Gallagher from 2010-2012 in the UK, Jules de Jongh from 2010-2012 in the US and Nicola Stapleton from 2017-2021) is a lively little tomboy tank engine who used to idolise Thomas, which bothered him. She is number 37, but she never had a number on her until Series 21. She works as both a shunting engine and a mixed-traffic engine. She was originally lavender in Series 10 until she was repainted red in Journey Beyond Sodor. She is based on an SR USA class.
Whiff (voiced by Keith Wickham from 2010-2018 in the UK and by William Hope from 2010-2018 in the US; voiced by Joe Pingue in the US and by Matt Coles in the UK in Thomas & Friends: All Engines Go) is a grubby green tank engine who wears glasses, and is number 66. He has a distinct two-tone whistle, and his main task is to collect rubbish and scrap, which explains his dirty appearance and smell. He is based on an NER 66 Aerolite.
Billy is a bubbly orange saddle tank engine with prominent buckteeth. He is based on a Manning Wardle.
Stanley (voiced by Matt Wilkinson in the UK and by Ben Small from 2011-2014, David Menkin from 2015, and Rob Rackstraw and then John Schwab from 2016 in the US) is a silver saddle tank engine who works as both a shunting engine and a mixed-traffic engine. He is based on a Hudswell Clarke.
Hank is an American tender engine. When he first arrived on Sodor, a welcome party was shortly thrown for him. He speaks with a Southern accent. He is based on a Pennsylvania Railroad class K4.
Flora is a bright yellow steam tram who works for Sodor Tramways in Great Waterton. She has her own tram car, which is her pride and joy.

CGI series
Hiro (voiced by Togo Igawa from 2009-2021 and by Kintaro Akiyama in the US and Dai Tabuchi in the UK in Thomas & Friends: All Engines Go) is an old and wise Japanese tender engine who is famously known as the "Master of the Railway", and is number 51. He was eventually brought to Sodor as its first and oldest engine. He soon broke down and was left on a siding for many years before Thomas rediscovered him. He was restored and pulls goods trains on the Main Line. He was sent back to Japan several times but ends up staying on Sodor for a while. He is based on a JNR Class D51.
Charlie (voiced by Matt Wilkinson in the UK and Glenn Wrage from 2010-2011, followed by Ben Small from 2012-2014, later Steven Kynman from 2016 in the US) is a playful purple saddle tank engine who loves to tell jokes and have fun, and is number 14. Like Billy, Charlie is based on a Manning Wardle.
Bash (voiced by Matt Wilkinson in the UK and William Hope in the US) and Dash (voiced by Keith Wickham in the UK and Kerry Shale in the US) are fun-loving tank engine twins that were sent to Misty Island as punishment for causing chaos on the Mainland. They now work on the Fat Controller's railway while supplying them with the Jobi Wood from Misty Island. 
Ferdinand (voiced by Ben Small in the UK and Glenn Wrage in the US) is a fun-loving tender engine that was sent to Misty Island with Bash and Dash as punishment for causing chaos on the Mainland. He now works on the Fat Controller's railway with the twins while supplying them with the Jobi Wood from Misty Island. His usual phrase is "That's right!" He is based on a Climax locomotive.
Scruff (voiced by Matt Wilkinson in the UK and Kerry Shale in the US) is a lime green Sentinel 969 0-4-0 Industrial Locomotive who works at the Waste Dump with Whiff.
Belle (voiced by Teresa Gallagher) is a large blue tank engine who is part of the Sodor Search and Rescue Team. She has a loud bell and water cannons on top of her tanks. She is based on a BR Standard Class 4 2-6-4T.
Flynn (voiced by Rupert Degas from 2011-2013, followed by Ben Small from 2013-2014, later by Rob Rackstraw from 2015-2019) is a fire engine who is part of the Sodor Search and Rescue Team. He operates as a road-rail vehicle, both on-road and rail. He speaks with an American accent.
Den (voiced by Keith Wickham) is a big hydraulic diesel engine who runs the Vicarstown Dieselworks. He is based on the Rolls-Royce C range engines.
Dart (voiced by Rupert Degas from 2011-2012, now Steve Kynman from 2013-2019) is a small diesel shunter who is Den's best friend and feisty assistant at the Vicarstown Dieselworks. Dart has worked with Den for so long…he can read Den's mind or engine.
Paxton (voiced by Steve Kynman) is a kind and friendly green diesel engine who often brings slate down from the Blue Mountain Quarry to other parts of Sodor. He can be a bit gullible, enabling other Diesels to take advantage of him. He is yet another British Rail Class 08.
Norman (voiced by Keith Wickham) is a vermillion diesel engine with a unibrow. He is Dennis' twin. Like Dennis, Norman is based on a British Rail 11001.
Sidney (voiced by Kerry Shale from 2011, and later by Bob Golding from 2013-2019) is a forgetful blue diesel engine who often takes goods trains to the Mainland. He had been lifted on a hoist at the Dieselworks for two years, waiting for his new wheels to come. As a Christmas present, Percy gave Sidney a new set of wheels, and he is now a really useful engine again. He is yet another British Rail Class 08.
Winston (voiced by Matt Wilkinson) is a red track inspection car and the Fat Controller's private mode of transportation on the rails. He is based on a Wickham trolley.
Stafford (voiced by Keith Wickham) is a battery-electric engine who usually works in the shunting yards.
Stephen (nicknamed "The Rocket") (voiced by Bob Golding) is based on Stephenson's Rocket who works at Ulfstead Castle, where he takes visitors around the castle grounds and across the rest of Sodor.
Connor (voiced by Jonathan Forbes) is an aquamarine streamlined tender engine that hails from the Mainland. He pulls passenger trains from Ulfstead Castle to Vicarstown Station and the other way around. He is based on the New York Central Hudson.
Caitlin (voiced by Rebecca O'Mara) is a magenta streamlined tender engine that hails from the Mainland. She pulls passenger trains from Ulfstead Castle to Vicarstown Station and the other way around. She is based on the Baltimore and Ohio P-7.
Porter (voiced by Steven Kynman from 2013-2019 in the UK and David Menkin from 2013 in the US) is a viridian saddle tank engine who works with Salty at Brendam Docks, usually shunting trucks. He is based on an H.K. Porter, Inc.
Gator (voiced by Clive Mantle) is a large green Colombian Steam Motor engine that ends up on Sodor for some random reason. During his time there, he becomes friends with Percy. His real name is Gerald, but he is nicknamed "Gator" because of his sloping water tank makes him look like an alligator.
Timothy (voiced by Tim Whitnall) is a little oil-burning saddle tank engine who works at the Sodor China Clay Company with Bill, Ben, and Marion.
Marion (voiced by Olivia Colman in from 2014-2018, singing voice provided by Teresa Gallagher from 2018 and Lucy Montgomery from 2020) is an orange self-propelled steam shovel who works at the China Clay Pits with Bill, Ben, and Timothy. She is very talkative and loves to tell stories of her discoveries.
Samson (voiced by Robert Wilfort) is a dark teal tank engine without a cab who works on the Mainland, and is number 15. He works with his personal brake van Bradford. 
Glynn (voiced by Keith Wickham) is a "coffee-pot" engine that used to work on Thomas' Branch Line before being abandoned, and is number 1. He was restored and now works alongside Stephen and Millie at Ulfstead Castle.
Philip (voiced by Rasmus Hardiker) is a cheery little diesel boxcab who works as a shunting engine at Knapford Station, and is number 68.
Ryan (voiced by Eddie Redmayne from 2015 and later Steven Kynman from 2016-2017) is a purple tank engine who works as a goods engine. He has the number 1014 on his bunker and is based on a GNR Class N2.
Skiff (voiced by Jamie Campbell Bower from 2015-2020 and by Jamie Watson in the US and by Jari Armstrong in the UK in Thomas & Friends: All Engines Go) is a railboat who helped his owner, Sailor John, and Thomas look at Captain Calles' lost treasure, thinking that they are going to give it to the museum until he found out Sailor John was intending to keep it for himself. After Sailor John was defeated and arrested for stealing the treasure, Skiff now gives railboat tours around Arlesburgh Harbour with his new owner, Captain Joe.
Hugo (voiced by Rob Rackstraw) is a silver rail zeppelin, unique for being fitted with a propeller. He is a very fast engine, whose spinning propeller makes him very popular with passengers. He is based on the Schienenzeppelin.
Ashima (voiced by Tina Desai from 2016-2020 and Diya Kittur in Thomas & Friends: All Engines Go) is a large pink tank engine, who worked on the Nilgiri Mountain Railway and then Indian Railways. She was made one out of many engines to participate in the Great Railway Show and competed in the Shunting Challenge. She has become very close friends with Thomas after the events. She is based on the Nilgiri Mountain Railway X class.
Vinnie (voiced by John Schwab) is a streamlined North American tender engine who competed in the Great Railway Show for the Strongest Engine competition. He is based on the Grand Trunk Western U4-a.
Frieda (voiced by Teresa Gallagher) is a big streamlined German tender engine who participated in the Great Railway Show. She was a contender in the strongest engine competition. She is based on a DB Class 10.
Ivan (voiced by Bob Golding) is a Russian diesel who competed in the Great Railway Show for the Shunting Challenge at least twice.
Axel (voiced by Rob Rackstraw) is a fast, Belgian streamlined tender engine who participated in the Great Railway Show. He was a contender in the Great Race. He is based on the SNCB Type 12.
Gina (voiced by Teresa Gallagher from 2016 and Anna Francolini from 2019-2020) is a small  Italian tank engine who once participated in the Shunting Challenge for the Great Railway Show.
Yong Bao (voiced by Dan Li from 2018-2019 and Chris Lew Kum Hoi from 2020 and by Patrick Kwok-Choon in the US and Lobo Chan in the UK in Thomas & Friends: All Engines Go) is a Chinese tender engine who took part in the Great Railway Show for the Best Decorated Engine Parade. He is based on the China Railways RM.
Raul (voiced by Rob Rackstraw in from 2016 and Ferderico Trujilo from 2019-2020) is a vertical-boiler tank engine who works on the Brazilian Railway. He participated in the Shunting Challenge at the Great Railway Show at least twice and was a former champion.
Shane (voiced by Shane Jacobson) is an Australian tender engine who participated in the Great Railway Show. He competed in the strongest engine competition. He is based on the South Australian Railways 520 class.
Carlos (voiced by David Bedella from 2016 and Gabriel Porras from 2018) is a small Mexican tender engine who has competed in the Great Railway Show, every year since the event's inspection. During the most recent one, he competed in the best decorated parade.
Rajiv (voiced by Nikhil Parmar) is a little Indian tank engine who was a contestant in the Great Railway Show. He competed in and won the Best Decorated Engine Parade, which he won. He usually transports passengers and goods from Kolkata to the north of India on the East Indian Railway. He is based on the Fairy Queen locomotive.
Etienne (voiced by Rob Rackstraw) is a fast, French electric engine who participated in the Great Railway Show. He was a contender in the Great Race, which he won. He is based on the SNCF BB 9003-9004.
Theo (voiced by Darren Boyd) is a shy experimental railway traction engine who works at the Steelworks on the Mainland.
Lexi (voiced by Lucy Montgomery) is a boisterous American cab forward engine who works at the Steelworks on the Mainland.
Merlin (voiced by Hugh Bonneville) is an experimental tender engine with three funnels who believes he has the power to turn invisible. He has the number 783 and is based on the LSWR N15 class.
Hurricane (voiced by Jim Howick) is a cunning,  large tank engine who works at the Steelworks on the Mainland along with Frankie. He has the number 20 and is based on the GER Class A55.
Frankie (voiced by Sophie Colquhoun) is a manipulative diesel engine who works at the Steelworks on the Mainland along with Hurricane. Frankie has the number 4002 on her buffer beam.
Sam (voiced by Rob Rackstraw) is a giant American tender engine originating from the Virginian Railway.
Kwaku (voiced by Abubakar Salim) is a large Garratt engine from Tanzania. He is close friends with Nia. He is based on an EAR 59 class.
Natalie (voiced by Teresa Gallagher) is a small American diesel shunter who works in San Francisco.
Beau (voiced by Kerry Shale) is an American tender engine with a moustache who works for a mining company near the Grand Canyon. He befriended Thomas during his journey around the world after Thomas derailed outside of a railway mine. He is based on a Jupiter locomotive.
Fernando (voiced by Gabriel Porras) is a teal diesel shunter who works on a railway near Brazil. He is the last British Rail Class 08.
Shankar (voiced by Sanjeev Bhaskar) is a diesel shunter who works on the Indian Railway.
Hong-Mei (voiced by Chipo Chung) is a Chinese tank engine Thomas met during his stay in China. She has her own pair of coaches named An-An and Yin-Long, whom are occasionally used by Thomas. One of her main jobs is to pull the Mail Train.
Tamika (voiced by Rose Robinson) is an Australian steam railmotor.
Noor Jehan (voiced by Sheena Bhattessa) is a diesel engine who works on Indian Railways. She is known for taking visitors on a tiger safari, in a set of express coaches painted in the same livery as her. She is based on the Indian locomotive class WDM-2.
Gabriela (voiced by Monica Lopera) is a tank engine who works at Guanabara Bay in Brazil. She is good friends with Cassia.
Lorenzo (voiced by Vincenzo Nicoli) is an Italian tender engine from Verona. He was lost in a mine for several years before being rediscovered by Thomas. He has a coach named Beppe.
Gustavo (voiced by Francisco Labbe) is a large electric engine who works on the Brazilian Railway. He is based on the Little Joe loco.
Marcia (voiced by Laura Cucurullo) and Marcio (voiced by Federico Trujillo) are two wood-burning tender engines who work on the Eucalyptus Railway in Brazil.
Sonny (voiced by Joe Swash) is a well tank engine from the Mainland who brought his two owners, Baz and Bernie, to Sodor to steal an invention from the Technology Fair for money. After meeting Thomas and helping out at the fair, Sonny wanted to be a really useful engine rather than a thief. After Baz and Bernie were captured and arrested for their crimes, the Fat Controller decided to give Sonny a second chance by letting him work on his railway. He is based on Haydock Collieries.
Kenji (voiced by Matt McCooey from 2018 Kintaro Akiyama in the US and Dai Tabuchi in the UK in Thomas & Friends: All Engines Go) is a high-speed electric engine from Japan, who visited Sodor for the Technology Fair. He is based on the 0 Series Shinkansen.
Duchess (voiced by Rosamund Pike) is a large cream-coloured tender engine that works on the Mainland. Her job is to transport the Royal Family to all their royal appointments. She is based on the LMS Coronation Class.

Thomas & Friends: All Engines Go
Kana (voiced by Ava Ro in the US and Chloe Rapheal in the UK) is a lavender electric bullet train from Japan and Kenji's sister. She is a speedy tomboy, and due to her speed, she often causes the trees and telephone poles to bend in her wake. Kana sometimes has some trouble with burning out her battery levels by speeding.
Sandy (voiced by Glee Dango in the US and Holly Dixon in the UK) is a pink rail speeder who works with Carly.

Narrow gauge engines

Classic series
Skarloey (voiced by Keith Wickham) is a red narrow gauge saddle tank engine and the oldest engine on the Skarloey Railway, and is number 1. In the higher-quality episodes of the series, Skarloey is portrayed as wise and dedicated like he was in the original books. He is based on "Talyllyn", of the Talyllyn Railway.
Rheneas (voiced by Ben Small from 2011-2013 and John Hasler from 2016) is a vermilion narrow gauge well tank engine and the Skarloey Railway's second engine, and is number 2. Rheneas is calm and easy going, and proved capable of getting his train home when he failed on a stormy day, earning him the nickname 'Gallant Old Engine'. He is based on "Dolgoch", of the Talyllyn Railway.
Sir Handel (originally known as "Falcon") (voiced by Keith Wickham) is a blue narrow gauge saddle tank engine who lives and works on the Skarloey Railway, and is number 3. He first worked on the Mid Sodor Railway. Sir Handel is occasionally zealous, overly proud and not above sneaking out of jobs he deems are below him, but he works hard nevertheless, and is also a goodhearted locomotive. He is based on "Sir Haydn", of the Talyllyn Railway.
Peter Sam (originally known as "Stuart") (voiced by Steven Kynman) is a green narrow gauge saddle tank engine who lives and works on the Skarloey Railway, and is number 4. He first worked on the Mid Sodor Railway. Peter Sam is very eager and hardworking, although he is susceptible to being easily influenced. He is based on "Edward Thomas", of the Talyllyn Railway.
Rusty (voiced by Matt Wilkinson) is a little narrow gauge diesel engine who carries out maintenance work and odd jobs around the Skarloey Railway, and is number 5. Rusty has a heart of gold and is not afraid to stick up for his work or an engine in trouble. He is based on "Midlander", of the Tayllyn Railway.
Duncan (voiced by Tom Stourton) is a grumpy Scottish narrow gauge well tank engine, who came to the Skarloey Railway as a "spare engine" after Peter Sam's accident with some slate trucks, and is number 6. Duncan is not work-shy but he has a tendency to criticize a lot about general matters. Despite his rough ways, he deeply cares for his friends. He is also well-meaning, hardworking, willing to help out his friends, and has a heart of gold. He is based on "Douglas", of the Talyllyn Railway.
Freddie is an old narrow gauge tank engine on the Skarloey Railway, and is number 7. He has a fun sense of humor. He is possibly one of the other engines from the Mid Sodor Railway, as Sir Handel recognized him immediately when he witnessed Freddie's return. He is based on "Russell", of the Talyllyn Railway.
Duke is an orange-brown narrow gauge tank-tender engine who is widely respected and considered a hero amongst all the engines, and is number 8. He is also one of the oldest engines on Sodor, having been ordered by and named after "His Grace" the Duke of Sodor for the Mid Sodor Railway, and whenever anything went wrong he would exclaim "That would never suit His Grace!" Duke is wise and faithful but stands for no nonsense. He was left in his old shed after his railway closed, but was eventually rescued for a new lease of life on the Skarloey Railway. He is based on a Festiniog Railway 0-4-0TT.
Smudger was an olive green narrow gauge tank engine who used to work on the Mid Sodor Railway and was later turned into a generator due to his tendency to misbehave and derail frequently. His fate was not revealed. Like Rheneas, Smudger is based on "Dolgogh", of the Talyllyn Railway.
Bertram (nicknamed "The Old Warrior" by the railway staff because of his bravery) is an old narrow gauge tank-tender engine who worked at the mines. He lived on a remote part of the Island that was once very rarely visited. His railway has since been restored and he now pulls passenger trains on it. Like Duke, Bertram is based on a Festiniog Railway 0-4-0TT.

New series
Mighty Mac are a blue double-ended engine and conjoined twins. Mighty is the "older" of the two and is distinguished by a small flick of hair. Mac is the "younger" half and is distinguished by his youthful features, round nose, and freckled cheeks. Despite the opposing personalities of the two ends, they are technically one engine. They are based on a Fairlie locomotive.
Proteus is a legendary yellow narrow gauge saddle tank engine with a magic lamp hung upon his funnel. Legend said that anyone would found the lamp and have their wishes granted. As Skarloey told this story about the Skarloey Railway engines, the clues to find the magic lamp are a rush of wind, a creaking sound and a flickering light. Peter Sam almost thought he discovered the lamp himself after hearing the story. Like Sir Handel, Proteus is based on "Sir Haydn", on the Tallyllyn Railway.

CGI series
Victor (voiced by Matt Wilkinson in the UK and David Bedella in the US) is a dark red narrow gauge tank engine from Cuba who works at the Sodor Steamworks with his assistant, Kevin. Victor always has a helpful, constructive disposition and is good-humored with everyone he meets.
Luke (voiced by Michael Legge) is a green Irish narrow gauge saddle tank engine who works primarily at the Blue Mountain Quarry on the Skarloey Railway, and is number 22.
Millie (voiced by Miranda Raison) is Sir Robert Norramby's private light blue French narrow gauge engine who works at Ulfstead Castle.

Miniature/minimum gauge engines

CGI series
Rex (voiced by Tom Stourton) is a small green tender engine who lives and works on the Arlesdale Railway. He is based on the Ravenglass & Eskdale locomotive River Esk.
Mike (voiced by Tim Whitnall) is a small strong grumpy red engine who prefers goods trains to passengers. He is based on the Ravenglass & Eskdale's River Mite.
Bert (voiced by Keith Wickham) is a small blue tender engine who is the quietest of the Arlesdale Railway engines.

Rolling stock

Classic series
Annie and Clarabel (both voiced by Teresa Gallagher from 2011-2020; Annie voiced by Catherine Disher in the US; Clarabel voiced by Linda Kash in the US and by Wendy Patterson in the UK in Thomas & Friends: All Engines Go) are Thomas' faithful coaches, whom he loves dearly and would never dream of being separated from them.
Henrietta (voiced by Maggie Ollerenshaw) is a faithful tram coach that travels with Toby. Percy usually takes her when Toby is absent.
The Troublesome Trucks (also called Cars or Freight Cars, originally Foolish Freight Cars, in the US) (voiced by Christopher Ragland, Ben Small from 2013-2014; voiced by Jamie Watson and Corey Doran and by Jai Armstrong in the UK in Thomas & Friends: All Engines Go) are pieces of rolling stock that are nicknamed so because they can be very troublesome and loved to play tricks on the engines. They can be Open Wagons, Vans, Tankers, or Brake Vans, depending on the type.
The Spiteful Brake Van was a troublesome brake van, who was subsequently crushed into pieces by Douglas, on the back of James' goods train.
Toad (voiced by Joe Mills) is Oliver's loyal brake van who escaped from scrap with the help of Douglas.
S.C.Ruffey is a cruel Troublesome Truck who is the ringleader of the other Troublesome Trucks. He was once split into pieces by Oliver, but in the end, he survived.
Old Slow Coach is an elderly Great Western Railway clerestory brake coach, known for her luxurious interior.

New series
Rocky (voiced by Matt Wilkinson in the UK and William Hope the US) is a large red breakdown crane who can lift heavy objects such as engines, coaches and trucks. He takes pride in his work and is always happy to help. He later becomes part of the Sodor Search and Rescue Team.
Hector (an acronym for "Heavily Engineered Coal Truck On Rails") is a large coal hopper truck who is good friends with Thomas and James. He first appeared in the eleventh series episode, "Hector the Horrid!", and he also appears in the twelfth series episode, "James Works it Out".

CGI series
The Slip Coaches (voiced by Jonathan Broadbent, Rebeca O'Mara and Steven Kynman) are three Great Western bogie coaches that work with Duck on the Little Western. They are special as they can be uncoiled at stations without the engine stopping. Duck calls them Slippies.
Judy (voiced by Teresa Gallagher) and Jerome (voiced by Tim Whitnall, respectively) are the two large sage green breakdown cranes on the Harwick Branch Line. They were originally stationed at Knapford Station.
Bradford (voiced by Rob Rackstraw) is Samson's trustworthy brake van who lives on the Mainland.
Hannah (voiced by Lucy Montgomery) is a "hasty" coach that once traveled with Toby. In the twenty-first series episode, "Hasty Hannah", she is portrayed as Henrietta's wacky sister.
An-An (voiced by See-See Hung) and Yin Long (voiced by Windson Long) are two Chinese coaches who help transport passengers on the China Railway.
Aubrey (voiced by Genevieve McCarty) and Aiden (voiced by Tim Bain) are Shane's pair of coaches. Thomas met and worked with them during his time in Australia.
Lei (voiced by Windsor Long) is a Chinese van who helps transport goods and materials on the China Railway.
Dexter (voiced by Mark Moraghan) is an old brake coach who was being abandoned on an overgrown siding, until he rediscovered by Duck and restored as a classroom.
Beppe (voiced by Vincenzo Nicoli) is a small passenger coach from Italy who works with Lorenzo.

Thomas & Friends: All Engines Go
Bruno (voiced by Chuck Smith in the US and Elliott Garcia in the UK) is an autistic red American brake van (or caboose). He has the ability to signal his feelings using his ladders, and there is a lantern mounted on his exterior to indicate his mood at any time. He also has ear defenders to use for loud noises. Bruno is the first autistic character to be introduced in the series.

Non-rail vehicles

Classic series
Terence (voiced by Tom Stourton) is an orange caterpillar tractor who usually works on a farm near Thomas' Branch Line. He often pulls vehicles who have become stuck. When Thomas first encountered Terence, he insulted Terence's caterpillars, but later discovered their usefulness while Terence pulled him out of a snowdrift. Terence has a removable bulldozer blade that he used to clear snow or any sort of rubble. He is based on a Caterpillar Model 70.
Bertie (voiced by Rupert Degas in Series 15-16 and Keith Wickham in Series 17-24) is a red bus who works alongside Thomas' Branch Line. He raced Thomas, and, though he lost, the two have been firm friends ever since. He is based on the Leyland Tiger.
Trevor (voiced by Nigel Pilkington in the UK and Christopher Ragland in the US) is a traction engine who resides at the Wellsworth Vicarage Orchard. He was due to be broken up before he was saved by Vicar of Wellsworth. He is based on the William Foster & Co. Traction Engine No. 14593.
Harold (voiced by Keith Wickham in Misty Island Rescue and Series 24 the UK and by Kerry Shale in Misty Island Rescue and Series 24 in the US, singing voice provided by Kerry Shale; voiced by Bruce Dow in the US and by Jai Armstrong in the UK in Thomas & Friends: All Engines Go) is a white helicopter who patrols the skies of the Island of Sodor, nicknamed "whirlybird" by the engines, searching for emergencies. He later becomes part of the Sodor Search and Rescue Team. He is based on the Sikorsky S-55.
Bulgy (voiced by Colin McFarlane) is a bad-tempered double-decker bus with an ideological opposition to railways. His favourite phrase is "Free the roads!" He is based on the AEC Regent III.
George is a green, grumpy steamroller whose interactions with engines generally lead to trouble. Whenever he is flattening a road, he is seen rebelling by saying "Railways are no good! Turn them into roads! Pull 'em up! Turn them into roads!" Despite being bad-tempered and mean to the engines, he readily learns his lesson after the events of "Bye George!" He is based on an Aveling-Barford R class steamroller.
Caroline is an elderly car owned by a cricketer from the Elsbridge Cricket Club on the Island of Sodor. She tends to overheat when traveling at high speeds. She is based on a Morris Oxford Bullnose Saloon.
Bulstrode (voiced by Jamie Watson in the US and Will Harrison-Wallace in the UK) is a self-propelled barge who used to work at Knapford Harbour, and later Brendam Docks.
Cranky (voiced by Matt Wilkinson in Series 13-24 in the UK and by Glenn Wrage in Series 13-24 the US; voiced by Cory Doran in the US and by Will Harrison-Wallace in the UK in Thomas & Friends: All Engines Go) is an olive green tower crane that works at Brendam Docks.
The Horrid Lorries are three small lorries who came to Sodor to take over the engines jobs, but were sent away following a series of accidents. All three have numberplates, which read "LOR 1", "LOR 2" and "LOR 3".
Butch (voiced by Rupert Degas in Series 15, Matt Wilkinson in Series 16-21 in the UK, Glenn Wrage in Series 15-16 and Steven Kynman in Series 17-21 in the US) is a yellow and navy blue breakdown lorry who is part of the Sodor Search and Rescue Team.
Tiger Moth is a yellow and red biplane, who is described to be reckless and daring. In the magazines, Tiger Moth has a face. Despite his name, he is based on the Nieuport 17.
Thumper is a driller with two arms and caterpillar tracks, used to loosen rocks at the quarry.
Elizabeth is a vintage Sentinel steam lorry, formerly owned by the Fat Controller.

New series
Jeremy is a jet plane who lives at the Sodor Airport. This was his only speaking role in "Thomas and the Jet Plane". He speaks with a booming voice. He is based on the BAC One-Eleven.
Madge is a green and cream snub-nosed lorry with a three-wheeled cab and a flatbed. She is described as a having a motherly attitude towards the Skarloey engines, and often eager to please-so much so she forgets her own priorities. She is based on the Scammell Scarab.
Colin is a stationary steam crane who works at the Wharf, and is good friends with Freddie. Colin has never been to a party because he cannot move, so Freddie decides to hold the party at the Wharf. He can load and unload cargo and trucks and barges.

CGI series
Kevin (voiced by Matt Wilkinson in Hero of the Rails and Big World! Big Adventures!, Kerry Shale in Series 21-23 in the UK and Kerry Shale in the US) is a yellow mobile crane who works at the Sodor Steamworks alongside Victor. Kevin's catchphrase is "It was a slip of the hook!" He is based on a Ransomes & Rapier crane.
Captain (voiced by Keith Wickham) is a blue, red and yellow coast guard lifeboat who is part of the Sodor Search and Rescue Team. He speaks with a Cockney accent with nautical slang. He based on the Liverpool-class lifeboat.
Merrick (voiced by Matt Wilkinson) is a sleepy, snoring gantry crane who is stationed at the Blue Mountain Quarry. Once he is needed, Merrick is wide awake and ready swing any boulder down to the stone cutting shed.
Owen (voiced by Ben Small in Blue Mountain Mystery and Series 18 and Rob Rackstraw in Series 23-24) is an orange incline engine who is stationed at the Blue Mountain Quarry. He never tires of sending slate trucks up and down and the incline.
Reg (voiced by Tim Whitnall) is a diesel-powered grappling crane at Crocks Scrap Yard on Edward's Branch Line.
Carly (voiced by Lucy Montgomery in Series 21-24; voiced by Kristin Fairlie and Jenna Warren in the US and by Eva Mohamed in the UK in Thomas & Friends: All Engines Go) is a bright yellow rolling gantry crane who works at Brendam Docks with Cranky and Big Mickey. In Thomas & Friends: All Engines Go, she has become a crane engine and works with Sandy.
Big Mickey (voiced by Rob Rackstraw) is a large hammerhead crane who works at Brendam Docks, alongside Cranky and Carly. He is the only character to appear in both Tugs and Thomas & Friends.
Beresford (voiced by Colin McFarlane in Journey Beyond Sodor and Series 24 and Dan Chameroy in Thomas & Friends: All Engines Go) is a blue rolling gantry crane who works at a canal on the Mainland, and later Norramby Beach. He speaks with a Jamaican accent and befriends Thomas by helping him hide from Hurricane and Frankie.
Ace (voiced by Peter Andre) is an Australian rally car who Thomas met in Big World! Big Adventures!. He inspired Thomas to become the first engine to travel around the world. He is based on the Triumph Spitfire.
Emerson (voiced by Gabriel Porras) is an aeroplane from Brazil. He is based on the Beechcraft Super King Air.
Kobe (voiced by Abubakar Salim) is a hammerhead crane who works at Dar es Salaam Docks in Tanzania. He unloads cargo from ships.
Cassia (voiced by Teresa Gallagher in Big World! Big Adventures!, Laura Cucurullo in Series 23 and Rachael Miller in Series 24) is a rolling portal crane who works at Gunabara Bay in Brazil. She is good friends with Gabriela.
Carter (voiced by Matt Wilkinson) is a green gantry crane who works at a dock in San Francisco, California.
Isla (voiced by Rachael Miller) is an air ambulance who befriends Thomas during his time working in Australia. She is the same type of plane as Emerson. Like Emerson, Isla is based on the Beechcraft Super King Air.
Ester (voiced by Flaminia Cinque) is a small excavator, who works for the Italian Construction Company.
Stefano (voiced by Antonio Magro) is a huge amphibious cargo ship from Sicily, Italy. He can run on both water and land. He is based on the LARC-LX.
Cleo (voiced by Harriett Kershaw) is a road engine who was built by Ruth out of locomotive parts, giving her an unusual appearance.

Thomas & Friends: All Engines Go
Tess (voiced by Kaia Ozdermir) is a young and impatient teal green rolling gantry crane who is based on Carly's original design.

Sodor Construction Company
In Series 6, a new set of characters was introduced called "The Pack". The characters were devised by then-producer Phil Fehrle with the intention of being turned into a spin-off series, possibly as a rival to HIT Entertainment's other successful show and brand Bob the Builder. This spin-off was partially filmed alongside the seventh series the following year but was not aired. The few completed episodes were released direct-to-DVD in 2006.

Classic series
Jack (voiced by Steven Kynman in Series 23 in the UK and David Menkin in King of the Railway and Series 20 in the US) is a friendly and enthusiastic front loader who works for the Sodor Construction Company, and is number 11. Despite a couple of accidents, he was able to prove himself when he saved Thomas from disaster, and is now part of the team. He was intended to be the main character of the spin-off. He is based on a modified Nuffield Universal tractor.
Alfie (voiced by Nathan Clarke in Sodor's Legend of the Lost Treasure and Series 20 and Tom Stourton in Series 23) is a little green excavator who works for the Sodor Construction Company, and is number 12. He is Jack's best friend and his motto is "More help means more dirt; more dirt means more fun!" He loves working hard, and handles even the toughest jobs with ease.
Oliver (voiced by Tim Whitnall) is a big excavator who works for the Sodor Construction Company, and is number 14. Oliver is not to be confused with Oliver the Western Engine.
Max (voiced by Tim Whitnall in Series 20 in the UK and Kerry Shale in Series 23 in the US) is a devious and troublesome red dump truck who works for the Sodor Construction Company, and is number 15.
Kelly is a crane truck who works for the Sodor Construction Company, and is number 17. He is the oldest member of the Pack, having originally belonged to Miss Jenny's father. He is good friends with Isobella and seems to trust Jack. He seems to be good at heart and to get on with everyone.
Byron is a giant bulldozer with a big blade belonging to the Sodor Construction Company, and is number 18. He is bit conceited, but likes to be useful like the rest of the Pack. He is based on  the Caterpillar D9.
Ned is an old steam shovel who works for the Sodor Construction Company, and is number 19.
Isobella is a yellow steam lorry who works for the Sodor Construction Company, and is number 22. She looks almost identical to Elizabeth. She is a hard worker, but does not like getting dirty.

Spin-off series
Nelson is an intelligent ballast tractor who works for the Sodor Construction Company, and is number 10. His job is to haul construction workers and the Pack to and from work. As the bearer of such weighty loads, he often feels overworked, but will never complain. He is proud of his paint job and is happiest when he looks his best.
Monty (voiced by Ramus Hardiker in Series 20 in the UK and Rob Rackstraw in Series 23 in the US) is a devious and troublesome red dump truck who works for the Sodor Construction Company, and is number 16. He is Max's twin brother.
Patrick is a boastful concrete transport truck who works for the Sodor Construction Company, and is number 23. He is based on a modified Mack NM 6-ton 6x6 truck.
Buster is a simple steamroller who goes about his job with pride and content. He looks almost identical to George and works for the Sodor Construction Company. What Buster lacks in imagination, he makes up for in heart, commitment and hard work and is liked by all the machines in the yard. He is the only member of the Pack not to wear a number.

CGI series
Brenda (voiced by Teresa Gallagher) is a bulldozer who works for the Sodor Construction Company, and is number 24. She, along with the rest of the construction vehicles come to Italy to assist with her archaeological dig. She was introduced in Series 23. Like Byron, Brenda is based on the Caterpillar D9.
Darcy (voiced by Harriet Kershaw in Series 23, Dana Puddicombe in the US and Jessica Carroll in the UK in Thomas & Friends: All Engines Go) is a tunnel boring machine who works for the Sodor Construction Company, and later the mines underneath Lookout Mountain. She was introduced in Series 23. She is based on the Roadheader.

Humans

Classic series
Sir Topham Hatt (also known as "The Fat Controller") (voiced by Keith Wickham in the UK, the US version beginning with The Adventure Begins and Series 24 and by Kerry Shale in Hero of the Rails and Series 18 in the US version; voiced by Bruce Dow in the US and by Tom Dussek in the UK in Thomas & Friends: All Engines Go) is the controller of the North Western Railway and formerly the Skarloey Railway. He first appeared in The Railway Series. He is one of the most iconic characters in the Thomas franchise, along with other characters such as Thomas and the Steam Team. He is a figure in the model series and is animated following the twelfth series. His catchphrases are "You are a really useful engine." when he is proud of his engines and "You have caused confusion and delay!" when one of the engines messes up on something.
Lady Hatt (voiced by Teresa Gallagher in the UK, the US version beginning with Series 18 and Jules de Jongh in Series 13 and Day of the Diesels in the US version) is the Fat Controller's wife. She is very kind towards the engines.
Stephen Topham Hatt (voiced by Matt Wilkinson and Teresa Gallagher in the UK, the US version beginning with Series 19, William Hope in Series 13 in the US version and Racheal Miller in Series 24) is the Fat Controller and Lady Hatt's grandson and Bridget Hatt's brother.
Bridget Amanda Hatt (voiced by Teresa Gallagher in the UK, the US version beginning with Series 19-24, Jules de Jongh in Series 13 in the US version and Rachael Miller in Series 24) is Sir Topham and Lady Hatt's granddaughter and Stephen Hatt's sister.
Farmer Finney (voiced by Keith Wickham) is Terence's driver and owner. In the 1996 annual story "James Gets Cracking", he owns a battery farm and a barn.
Mrs. Kyndley is an elderly lady who lives with her husband in a cottage near Hackenbeck Tunnel.
Jem Cole (voiced by Christopher Ragland) is the operator of Trevor and George and is a good friend of the Rev. Charles Laxey. He has his own yard at Killaban.
The Reverend Charles Laxey (sometimes simply known as The Vicar) is the Vicar of Wellsworth. He is also the owner of Trevor the Traction Engine and lives in the vicarage at Wellsworth.
Farmer Trotter (voiced by Matt Wilkinson in the UK and Kerry Shale in the US) is the owner and operator of a pig farm. He also keeps beehives and has been known to herd sheep. According to a magazine article, he also keeps cows and chickens and grows carrots and potatoes. Jem Cole, Terence and Trevor sometimes work on his farm.
The Refreshment Lady is worked at Lakeside where she owned a small cafe called Neptune Refreshments. She later opened a mobile tea shop made from an old coach discovered by Rusty and Peter Sam.
Nancy is a guard's daughter who lives near the Skarloey Railway and occasionally polished the engines.
Tom Tipper (voiced by Keith Wickham) is a postman who services Callan.
Dowager Hatt (voiced by Keith Wickham) is the Fat Controller's elderly mother.
Old Bailey (voiced by Matt Wilkinson in the UK and Kerry Shale in the US) is a fogman and is also the current stationmaster of the Hawin Lake station.
Mr. Conductor (played by Alec Baldwin) is a centimetre tall conductor who narrated the television series episodes that aired on Shining Time Station. He also has a cousin named Junior. He was portrayed by Ringo Starr on the first series of Shining Time Station, by George Carlin for the rest of the show, including its following up Mr. Conductor's Thomas Tales and by Alec Baldwin in Thomas and the Magic Railroad, each one being a different member for the Conductor family.
Burnett Stone (played by Peter Fonda) is the caretaker of Muffle Mountain and can be rather grumpy at times. He is Lily's grandfather and Lady's driver.
Lily Stone (played by Mara Wilson) is the granddaughter of Burnett Stone. She lives in the city with her mother. With the help of her grandfather Patch, they helped restore Lady to her former glory and returned to the Magic Railroad.
Mr. Conductor Jr. (also known as "C Junior" or "Junior" for short) (played by Michael E. Rodgers) is Mr. Conductor's lazy cousin. Like his cousin, he is at a regular height on Sodor and the Magic Railroad - anywhere else, he shrinks to a height of 24 centimetres (10 inches).
Patch (played by Cody McMains) is a young teenage boy who lives in Shining Time. He works with Burnett Stone.
Stacy Jones (played by Didi Conn) is the manager of Shining Time Station. Didi Conn reprised the role she played in Shining Time Station. 
Billy Twofeathers (played by Russell Means) is a Native American resident railroad engineer on the Indian Valley Railroad and driver of the Rainbow Sun, as well as the handyman at Shining Time Station. In the series Shining Time Station, Billy was played by Tom Jackson.
Mrs. Stone (played by Lori Hallier) is Lily's mother and Burnett's wife who lives in the big city with her daughter.
Tasha Stone (played by Laura Bower) is Burnett's late wife and Lily's deceased grandmother. It was her death, along with Burnett's inability to make Lady steam, that made him really depressed.
Cyril (voiced by Kerry Shale) is a fog signalman who lives in a small old cottage in Misty Valley. Aside from being a fog signalman, he has also been shown to be a lighthouse keeper and farmhand.
Jenny Packard (affectionally known as Miss Jenny) (voiced by Harriet Kershaw) is an Irish woman who is the owner and leader of the Sodor Construction Company and takes responsibility for a number of the bigger building projects around Sodor along with the Foreman.
The Foreman (voiced by Keith Wickham) is Miss Jenny's second-in-command and a member of the Sodor Construction Company.
Farmer McColl (voiced by Matt Wilkinson in the UK and William Hope in the US) owns a farm on Thomas' Branch Line. He also owns the field across the line from the farm and a farm on the Main Line. Toby enjoys visiting him and his animals.
Allicia Botti (voiced by Jules de Jongh) is a famous opera singer from Italy.
The Sodor Brass Band (voiced by Keith Wickham) is a group of musicians who originally came from the Mainland. They play music using brass instruments at special events and locations.
Lord Callan (voiced by Keith Wickham) is the lord and owner of the Callan Castle and nearby surrounding land, including the infamous Black Loch. He lives at Callan Castle, where he often holds special events and celebrations.
The Duke (voiced by Matt Wilkinson in the UK and William Hope in the US) and Duchess of Boxford (voiced by Teresa Gallagher in the UK and Jules de Jongh in the US) often visit Sodor with their private engine, Spencer. However, since the fifteenth series, they appear to have lived at the summer house.

New series
Mr. Peregrine Percival (also known as "The Narrow Gauge Controller" and "The Thin Controller") (voiced by Keith Wickham in the UK and Kerry Shale in the US) is the current controller of the Skarloey Railway and the Culdee Fell Railway.
The Mayor of Sodor (voiced by Keith Wickham in the UK and David Bedella in the US) is in charge of the Island.

CGI series
Sir Lowham Hatt (voiced by Keith Wickham in the UK and Kerry Shale in the US) is the jolly twin brother of the Fat Controller.
Mr. Kuffy Bubbles (also known as Kuffy and Mr. Giggles) (voiced by Keith Wickham in the UK version beginning with Misty Island Rescue and Michael Brandon in the US) is a clown famous for blowing very big bubbles and performing with very large balloons.
Sir Robert Norramby (voiced by Mike Grady) is the current Earl of Sodor. He owns Ulfstead Castle as well as its Estate Railway, and is a good friend of the Fat Controller. He is also Duke's current grace.
The Grumpy Passenger (voiced by Keith Wickham) is a grumpy man who often grumbles and complains. He is a resident of the Island of Sodor and is a frequent user of its railways despite his negative opinion of them.
Sailor John (voiced by John Hurt) is a pirate who was in the navy, Skiff's previous owner and the main antagonist in Sodor's Legend of the Lost Treasure.
Captain Joe (voiced by Matt Wilkinson) is Skiff's current captain and the lighthouse keeper at Alesburgh Harbour.
Mr. Fergus Duncan (also known as "The Small Controller") (voiced by Rob Rackstraw) is the General Manager of the Arlesdale Railway. He is actually taller than both the Fat Controller and the Thin Controller; his nickname refers to the fact that is railway often called the "Small Railway".
The Thin Clergyman (voiced by Rob Rackstraw) is an English Anglican clergyman, railway enthusiast, and children's author. He is a fictionalised version of Wilbert Awdry, the author of The Railway Series.
The Fat Clergyman (voiced by Tom Stourton) is a railway enthusiast and a close friend of The Thin Clergyman, the author of The Railway Series. He is a fictionalised version of Teddy Boston.
Willie (voiced by Keith Wickham in Series 20 and Steven Kynman in Series 24) is an idle farm hand and tractor driver, who lives near the Arlesdale Railway.
Charubala (voiced by Sheena Bhattessa) is the controller of the Indian Railway.
Dame Bella Canto (voiced by Becky Overton) is a famous Italian opera singer.
Ruth (voiced by Dominique Moore) is an inventor who lived in her own Workshop on the Ffarquhar Branch Line. She moved from the United States to the Island of Sodor after the Technology Fair, aiding engines of the North Western Railway whenever her technical expertise is required.
Baz (voiced by Bob Golding) and Bernie (voiced by Rob Rackstraw) are two criminals from the Mainland who visited the Technology Fair.

References

Notes

Fictional locomotives
Television characters introduced in 1984
Thomas & Friends characters
Lists of character lists
Fictional vehicles
Lists of characters in British television animation
Thomas & Friends
British railway-related lists